118 may refer to:
118 (number)
AD 118
118 BC
118 (TV series)
118 (film)
118 (Tees) Corps Engineer Regiment
118 (Tees) Field Squadron, Royal Engineers

See also
11/8 (disambiguation)
Oganesson, synthetic chemical element with atomic number 118